"The Master and His Pupil" is an English fairy tale collected by Joseph Jacobs in his English Fairy Tales.

Synopsis
A learned man had a book in which he had the knowledge to control demons. His foolish pupil one day found it open and read a spell from it. Beelzebub (a demon) appeared and demanded a task from him, or he would strangle him. The pupil set him to watering a flower, but Beezlebub went on watering it until the room was filling with water. At that point, the man, having remembered he left his book unlocked, returned and dispelled Beezlebub.

See also
 The Sorcerer's Apprentice
 Sweet porridge

References

External links

Master and His Pupil
Joseph Jacobs